Bluesy Burrell (also released as Out of This World) is an album by guitarist Kenny Burrell with saxophonist Coleman Hawkins recorded in 1962 and originally released on the Moodsville label.

Reception

AllMusic awarded the album 3 stars stating "This session is valuable for the majestic playing of tenor great Coleman Hawkins, who performs on half of the eight tracks". The All About Jazz review stated "It's definitely a variety album, with many tunes to choose from. Burrell is the star (his high ringing tone also plays octaves here and there), but everyone has their time in the spotlight, especially Hawkins, having a grand time on his last session for Prestige".

Track listing 
All compositions by Kenny Burrell except where noted
 "Tres Palabras" (Osvaldo Farrés) – 6:40    
 "No More" – 1:50    
 "Guilty" (Harry Akst, Gus Kahn, Richard A. Whiting) – 4:15    
 "Montono Blues" – 4:40    
 "I Thought About You" (Jimmy Van Heusen, Johnny Mercer) – 4:40    
 "Out of This World" (Harold Arlen, Johnny Mercer) – 4:50    
 "It's Getting Dark" – 6:50

Personnel 
Kenny Burrell – guitar
Coleman Hawkins – tenor saxophone (tracks 1, 4, 5 & 7)
Tommy Flanagan – piano
Major Holley – bass
Eddie Locke – drums
Ray Barretto – congas

References 

Kenny Burrell albums
Coleman Hawkins albums
1963 albums
Moodsville Records albums
Albums produced by Ozzie Cadena
Albums recorded at Van Gelder Studio